Juniper is a 2021 New Zealand drama film directed by Matthew J. Saville, starring Charlotte Rampling.

Plot
Set in rural New Zealand in the 1990s, the film tells the story of the developing relationship of the adolescent Sam and his acerbic and alcoholic grandmother with an unconventional past, whom he has not met before.

Cast
Charlotte Rampling as Ruth
George Ferrier as Sam
Marton Csokas as Robert, Sam's father
Edith Poor as Sarah, Ruth's nurse

Production
Juniper is written and directed by Matthew J. Saville, in his directorial debut feature film.

It was produced by Desray Armstrong and Angela Littlejohn.

The name derives from juniper berries, a key ingredient in gin, to which Ruth is addicted and drinks by the jugful every day.

Release
Juniper screened in many film festivals:
2021
Bari International Film Festival (International Panorama Competition, Best Actress in a Leading Role, Charlotte Rampling)
Atlantic International Film Festival – Special Presentation,
Cinéfest Sudbury International Film Festival
Edmonton International Film Festival
Brisbane International Film Festival
Tallinn Black Nights Film Festival
2022
 Palm Springs International Film Festival
 Santa Barbara International Film Festival
 Edinburgh International Film Festival

It was released in cinemas in New Zealand on 28 October 2021, and in Australia in August 2022, distributed by Transmission Films.

Reception
The film received generally positive reviews. Review aggregator Rotten Tomatoes reports that 96% of 23 critics have given the film a positive review, with an average rating of 6.8 out of 10. The website's critical consensus reads, "Juniper's story offers few surprises -- and it doesn't need any, with Charlotte Rampling holding the viewer rapt from start to finish".

The Hollywood Reporter praised its writing in the dialogue between Sam and Ruth. Australian Financial Review wrote "New Zealand films are known for their expansive feeling for landscape, and Juniper is no exception", and "Rampling is predictably good as the tough, intelligent, old woman, but Ferrier, on debut is excellent in the role of a teenage boy struggling towards a hard-won maturity". The ABC's Jason Di Rosso said that Rampling's role was slightly reminiscent of her role in Swimming Pool (2003) and "Saville succeeds in creating an emotional authenticity to Ruth and Sam's difficult relationship...". FilmInk wrote "...the real star here is Rampling. She is subtly sensational, conveying complex emotions with a single glance.", and praised Saville's direction, done "with great compassion and insight".

References

External links
 

2021 films
2020s English-language films
2020s New Zealand films
New Zealand black comedy films
New Zealand drama films
2021 directorial debut films